Arnold Metzger (24 February 1892 – 16 August 1974) was a German philosopher.

Life
Metzger was born in Landau. He was a student of Edmund Husserl. Having served in World War I, and been imprisoned in Siberia, he made his way back to Germany in 1919. On the way he participated in a soldiers' soviet in Brest-Litovsk.

Leaving Nazi Germany, Metzger lived in the United States for 20 years. He returned, and took up a teaching position in Munich.

Metzger died in Bad Gastein, in 1974.

Works
Phänomenologie und Metaphysik (1933)
Freiheit und Tod (1955), English translation (selections) by Ralph Mannheim, 1972.

References 
Biography (in German) on Deutsche Biographie

Notes

1892 births
1974 deaths
20th-century German philosophers
People from Landau
Husserl scholars
German prisoners of war in World War I
Jewish emigrants from Nazi Germany to the United States
Simmons University faculty
Academic staff of the Ludwig Maximilian University of Munich